Year 382 BC was a year of the pre-Julian Roman calendar. At the time, it was known as the Year of the Tribunate of Crassus, Mugillanus, Cornelius, Fidenas, Camerinus and Mamercinus (or, less frequently, year 372 Ab urbe condita). The denomination 382 BC for this year has been used since the early medieval period, when the Anno Domini calendar era became the prevalent method in Europe for naming years.

Events

By place

Greece 
 Pelopidas, a Theban general and statesman, flees to Athens and takes the lead in attempts to liberate Thebes from Spartan control.
 In punishment for his unauthorized action in the previous year of taking over Thebes, Phoebidas is relieved of his command, but the Spartans continue to hold Thebes. The Spartan king Agesilaus II argues against punishing Phoebidas, on the grounds that his actions had benefited Sparta, and this was the only standard against which he ought to be judged.
 Evandrus takes over being Archon of Athens from Demonstrates.

Fictional Events
In the Harry Potter film series, Ollivander's, a wand purchasing shop in Diagon Alley, was founded.

Births 
 Philip II, king of Macedon (d. 336 BC), son of Amyntas III of Macedon and Eurydike of Lynkestis
 Antigonus I Monophthalmus (d. 301 BC), Macedonian general under Alexander the Great and king of Macedon 306-301

Deaths 
 Orontes I of Armenia (b. 425 BC), son of Artasyrus

References